The John and Edna Truesdell Fischer Farmstead is a private farm, including house and outbuildings, located at 4896-5228 Sheldon Road in Canton Township, Michigan. The 1897 Queen Anne farmhouse located on the site is also known as the Michael and Catherine Hasselbach Fischer House. It was listed on the National Register of Historic Places in 2000.

Description 

The John and Edna Truesdell Fischer Farmstead consists of a ten-acre field with multiple buildings, including an 1897 Queen Anne house, a 1945 ranch house, 18 greenhouses, a boiler house, and a modern garage.  The remains of a barn, silo, and milkhouse are also located on the property.  The greenhouses are gable-end bays covered with paned glass, and were constructed in the 1940s for market farming.

The 1897 Queen Anne style house is typical of the style, but is relatively unusual in the local area where gabled-ell and upright-and-wing farmhouses were more popular through the turn of the century.  The house has a cross plan, and the exterior contains typical Queen Anne details such as fishscale shingles and bay windows.

History
Michael Fischer immigrated to the US from Wurttemberg, Germany in 1847 when he was 14 years old; his wife, Catherine Hasselbach, immigrated from Hesse Darmstadt, Germany in 1852.  The couple settled in Sheldon Corners where Michael opened a blacksmith shop.  In 1862, they purchased the land this farmstead sits on and constructed a house.  In 1897 their son John built the Queen Anne house on the property.  The quality of the house is significant, in that it attests to the degree of affluence and assimilation attained by these second generation farmers.

See also
Canton Township MPS
Canton Charter Township, Michigan

References

Further reading 
 - multiple Fischer pictures, including John and Edna's wedding picture.

Houses on the National Register of Historic Places in Michigan
Queen Anne architecture in Michigan
Houses completed in 1897
Houses in Wayne County, Michigan
Historic districts on the National Register of Historic Places in Michigan
Farms on the National Register of Historic Places in Michigan
National Register of Historic Places in Wayne County, Michigan